Jaime Mata Arnaiz (born 24 October 1988) is a Spanish professional footballer who plays for Getafe CF as a striker.

Club career
Born in Madrid, Mata finished his youth career with local Galáctico Pegaso, making his senior debut with the reserves in 2007. After appearing with the main squad in Tercera División, he moved to neighbouring Rayo Vallecano in December 2009, being immediately loaned to UD Socuéllamos in the same level.

Mata was subsequently loaned to CD Móstoles of the same league in August 2010, in a season-long deal. He returned to Rayo in summer 2011, being assigned to the B team in the Segunda División B.

On 5 July 2012, Mata signed for Lleida Esportiu also in the third division. After scoring 32 goals over two seasons, he moved to Segunda División after agreeing to a two-year deal with Girona FC.

Mata played his first match as a professional on 24 August 2014, starting in a 1–0 home win against Racing de Santander. He scored his first goal six days later, the winner in a 2–1 away victory over AD Alcorcón.

On 11 June 2015, in the first leg of the promotion playoffs' semi-finals, Mata scored a brace in a 3–0 away defeat of Real Zaragoza. On 30 June 2016, after again being knocked out in the playoffs, he signed a two-year contract with Real Valladolid also of the second tier.

Mata scored a career-best 36 goals in his second season at the Estadio José Zorrilla, notably netting a hat-trick in a 5–1 away rout of Lorca FC on 19 May 2018. On 2 July, he signed a three-year contract with La Liga club Getafe CF as a free agent, making his debut in the competition on 24 August at the age of 29 years and ten months in a 2–0 home win against SD Eibar where he played 79 minutes.

Mata scored his first top-flight goal on 1 October 2018, the equaliser in a 1–1 away draw with RC Celta de Vigo. In the following year, he scored braces against Deportivo Alavés, Celta and SD Huesca, being also named the competition's best player for the month of February. 

On 17 October 2020, Mata scored a penalty in a 1–0 victory over FC Barcelona, the club's first against that opponent since 2011.

International career
On 15 March 2019, Mata was called up by Spain national team manager Luis Enrique for two UEFA Euro 2020 qualifying matches against Norway and Malta. He won his first cap against the former, after coming on as an 89th-minute substitute for Álvaro Morata in the 2–1 win in Valencia.

Career statistics

Club

International

References

External links

1988 births
Living people
Spanish footballers
Footballers from Madrid
Association football forwards
La Liga players
Segunda División players
Segunda División B players
Tercera División players
Divisiones Regionales de Fútbol players
Rayo Vallecano B players
UD Socuéllamos players
CD Móstoles footballers
Lleida Esportiu footballers
Girona FC players
Real Valladolid players
Getafe CF footballers
Spain international footballers